Arctic Norway comprises the northernmost parts of Norway that lie above the Arctic circle. Norway reaches from approximately 58°N to 81°N, so large parts lie north of the Arctic circle at 66°33′. In Norway, the name Northern Norway is used for the northernmost part of mainland Norway, while Arctic Norway is often understood as Svalbard.

Geography

Arctic Norway consists of four geographically separated parts:
 Mainland Norway, from 66°33′ to 71°11'N;
 Svalbard, located from 76°28 to 80°49' N;
 Bjørnøya (Bear Island), situated at 74°31′N 19°01′E;
 Jan Mayen, situated at 70°59′N 8°32′W.

The Arctic circle crosses mainland Norway at Saltfjellet, which separates Helgeland from the northern part of Nordland county. Thus about half of the county lies north of the Arctic circle, along with the whole of Troms and Finnmark counties. The total area of mainland Norway above the Arctic circle is ca. . The population is about 393,000, which makes this the most populated arctic region in the world.

The population is about 2,400, and includes Longyearbyen, the northernmost town in the world.

The population is 9, which is the staff of the weather station.

Jan Mayen is situated some 880 km northwest of mainland Norway and about 450 km off the coast of Greenland. It has an area of 373 km2. The population is 18, which is the staff of the weather station.

Geography of Norway
Arctic